Beas is a municipality located in the province of Huelva, Spain. According to the 2005 census, the village had a population of 4,162 inhabitants.

Demographics

References

External links
Beas - Sistema de Información Multiterritorial de Andalucía

Municipalities in the Province of Huelva